The members of the 5th General Assembly of Newfoundland were elected in the Newfoundland general election held in 1852. The general assembly sat from 1853 to 1855.

John Kent was chosen as speaker.

Ker Baillie-Hamilton served as civil governor of Newfoundland.

Although Baillie-Hamilton was opposed to any change in the colony's system of government, in March 1854, Philip Francis Little and Robert John Parsons, with the support of Joseph Hume, were able to persuade the secretary of state for the colonies, the Duke of Newcastle, to grant responsible government to the colony.

Later in 1854, the assembly passed a Representation Act to double the number of seats in the assembly; this satisfied one of the conditions set by Newcastle for implementation of responsible government.

Baillie-Hamilton delayed the upcoming general election until May 1855 because he felt that a winter election would be unfair to Protestant voters living in remote areas of the colony.

Members of the Assembly 
The following members were elected to the assembly in 1852:

Notes:

By-elections 
None

References 

Newfoundland
005